The fifth season of the American neo-Western television series Justified premiered on January 7, 2014, on FX, and concluded on April 8, 2014, consisting of 13 episodes. The series was developed by Graham Yost based on Elmore Leonard's novels Pronto and Riding the Rap and his short story "Fire in the Hole". Its main character is Raylan Givens, a deputy U.S. Marshal. Timothy Olyphant portrays Givens, a tough federal lawman, enforcing his own brand of justice in his Kentucky hometown. The series is set in the city of Lexington, Kentucky, and the hill country of eastern Kentucky, specifically in and around Harlan. The fifth season was released on DVD and Blu-ray in region 1 on December 2, 2014.

Plot
The fifth season focuses on the gator-farming Crowe crime family, led by Darryl Crowe Jr. (Michael Rapaport). The season opens with Dewey Crowe winning a lawsuit against the state following his forced breakout of prison. After learning about Dewey's new found fortune, cousin Darryl moves his clan to Kentucky and takes over Dewey's business. Boyd struggles to maintain control over the drug trade after the Detroit Mob begins to disintegrate. On top of this his shipments are getting hit and getting Ava out of prison is proving to be difficult. Raylan, learning about Darryl's relocation begins to attempt to turn Darryl's sister Wendy (Alicia Witt) by convincing her that her son Kendal is in danger around Darryl. Art learns from a former Detroit player, Picker, that someone in law enforcement was behind the murder of a major Detroit enforcer in Kentucky. The information inadvertently helps Art capture Theo Tonin cementing his legacy. Raylan confesses his part in the murder of the Detroit enforcer leading to rift in their relationship.

Darryl and Boyd cut a deal to traffic heroin from Mexico to regain control of the drug trade but soon learns cousin Johnny has been behind the attacks on his shipments. After a deal is struck with a cartel, the Crowes murder Johnny's men and try to make themselves indispensable to Boyd by offering their own route out of Mexico. Ava is framed for the attempted murder of a guard by the guard himself and is sent to maximum security forcing her to attempt to cut her own deals in prison to survive. Bad blood explodes within the Crowes after Dewey steals the heroin shipment after one insult too many. While moving a witness against the Crowes, Art is shot and Kendal takes credit despite all signs pointing to Darryl. Raylan, out for revenge, get unexpected assistance from Boyd and later Wendy after threatening to have Kendal charged as an adult. Other stories include Raylan's reluctance to see his new daughter in Florida but agreeing to move there after his confession to Art. Wynn Duffy turns to a former major Dixie Mafia boss, Katherine Hale (Mary Steenburgen), on what to do about Boyd. Rachel Brooks, new head of the Lexington office, informing Raylan his transfer is denied until they finally end Boyd's criminal enterprise with the help of a surprise witness.

Cast and characters

Main
 Timothy Olyphant as Deputy U.S. Marshal Raylan Givens
 Nick Searcy as Chief Deputy U.S. Marshal Art Mullen
 Jere Burns as Wynn Duffy
 Joelle Carter as Ava Crowder
 Jacob Pitts as Deputy U.S. Marshal Tim Gutterson
 Erica Tazel as Deputy U.S. Marshal Rachel Brooks
 Walton Goggins as Boyd Crowder

Recurring

Guest
 Adam Arkin as Theo Tonin
 Jeremy Davies as Dickie Bennett
 Kaitlyn Dever as Loretta McCready
 Max Perlich as Sammy Tonin

Production
On March 28, 2013, FX renewed Justified for a fifth season, which premiered on January 7, 2014.

Casting
Jere Burns, who has recurred throughout the first four seasons as Wynn Duffy was made a series regular.

Filming
Episodes were shot in California. The small town of Green Valley, California often doubles for Harlan, Kentucky.

Episodes

Reception

Reviews
On Rotten Tomatoes, the season has an approval rating of 96% with an average score of 8 out of 10 based on 28 reviews. The website's critical consensus reads, "Justified continues to bring the shock value with clever storylines and a potent blend of comedy and drama." On Metacritic, the season has a weighted average score of 84 out of 100, based on 14 critics, indicating "universal acclaim.

Accolades
Walton Goggins received a nomination for Best Supporting Actor in a Drama Series for the 4th Critics' Choice Television Awards. Production designer Dave Blass, art director Oana Bogdan and decorator Shauna Aronson were nominated for the Primetime Emmy Award for Outstanding Art Direction for a Contemporary or Fantasy Series (Single-Camera) for the episode "A Murder of Crowes".

References

External links
 

05
2014 American television seasons